Yevgeny Cherkasov (12 October 1930 – 20 November 2013) was a Russian sport shooter who competed in the 1956 Summer Olympics and in the 1960 Summer Olympics.

References

1930 births
2013 deaths
Russian male sport shooters
ISSF pistol shooters
Olympic shooters of the Soviet Union
Shooters at the 1956 Summer Olympics
Shooters at the 1960 Summer Olympics
Olympic silver medalists for the Soviet Union
Olympic medalists in shooting
Medalists at the 1956 Summer Olympics